Dagai is a village and Union Council of Tehsil Razzar and Swabi District in Khyber Pakhtunkhwa province of Pakistan.

Dagai, known from outside as Yarhussain Dagai, is located 5 km south of Shewa adda, the main commercial area of the region, and 2 km east of  Yarhussain. It is one of the largest villages in district Swabi. According to the census of 1998 (Pakistan), its population was over 16000. It lies in the most southern part of Swabi, with Dandoka to its north, Yarhussain to its west, Maneri to its east and Urmal Dheri to its south.

Facilities 
Dagai has one Regional Health Center (RHC), currently under construction, one post office, one higher secondary school and many schools for girls, as well as two govt high school for boys. There is one HBL Branch and one utility store in Dagai. in 2012, a cricket Academy (Junaid Khan Cricket Academy) was opened for the boys to train and produce new cricket players.

Living 
Majority of the people are associated with agriculture for their direct and indirect income. The area is rich in growing crops vegetables and crops like wheat, maize, sugarcane, rice, and cash crop like tobacco. Other famous professions are teaching, businesses, freelancers skilled workers and public services covering almost all sectors of life from health to finance. The overseas job market is considered attractive for both highly educated skilled individuals as well as for unskilled masses and to date remains the major revenue source for the area. Major destinations for work are countries like Saudi Arabia, UAE, Oman, and other gulf countries etc. The people are very warm-hearted and hospitable. The society also participates in social events actively. The weddings are celebrated almost three days long with traditional dishes and sweets with a large number of attendees. Likewise, the death is mourned together with praying for the lost one. Eid is the biggest occasion of the year, twice after Ramadan and the day following the Hajj. People usually visit each other and share food and greetings to relatives, neighbors and the poor. There is no other notable fest or celebration around the year.

Demographics 
People of Dagai mostly belong to the Yousafzai tribe of Pukhtoons.

Notable people 

 Waris Khan ANP MNA Representative
 Uzair Khan Computer Engineer
Fazal Dad Khan (1929–1999), Pakistani politician
 Maulana Hamdullah Jan (1914-2019), Pakistani Islamic scholar
 Akhtar Munir
 Haji Rehmat Khan
 Haji Mahabat Khan
 Shahbaz Khan
 Malak Zamarrud
 Ishtiaq AKY
 Mansoor Abdalii
 Ismail Blogger

Suburbs 
Suburbs include Sikandarai, Bachai, Sapruna, Shumlo, Kaday, Rashaka, Mathra, Mohib Banda, Khamacha, Badraga, Shukaa, Saro Wand, Sadray Khair abad Hamza khel, and junakhel is the most large mohllah in dagi

References

Populated places in Swabi District
Union Councils of Swabi District